Betaal Pachisi is an Indian television series based on the comic strip The Phantom. The 49-episode Hindi series originally ran from 1997 to 1998 on DD Metro. It was directed by Sunil Agnihotri and starred Shahbaz Khan, Sonu Walia, Puneet Issar, Tom Alter and Vindu Dara Singh.

Cast

Shahbaz Khan as Betaal
A. K. Hangal as Baba
Tom Alter as CID Officer Harry
Sonu Walia  as TV reporter
Vindu Dara Singh as Zulmato
Puneet Issar as Kabira (Main antagonist) aka Danav Samrat
Krutika Desai Khan as Naina Jogan
Nimai Bali as Teja
Shiva Rindani as Hiboo/Evu Jingora
Mac Mohan as Mackie
Shehzad Khan as Shahdie
Sudhir as Bash
Mamik Singh
Sagar Salunke
Arjun as Marko the Magician
Rajendra Gupta as Felix the Don / Professor
Deep Dhillon as Jakaali
Javed Khan as Forest Officer
Akhilendra Mishra as Kroor Singh
Reena Wadhwa as Maharani Kakooti
Tinnu Anand as Alex the Don
Polly as ET
Surendra Pal as Zulmato's sidekick
Archana Joglekar as Nagin
Daman Maan as Jadugar Garsha
Usha Bachani as Rajkumari Ballari
Vinod Kapoor 
Hemant Birje as Tarzan

Controversy

The show faced a lawsuit when King Features Syndicate filed a case arguing that Sunil Agnihotri had copied the idea of The Phantom comic strips  for the Betaal series. However, the court ruled that only the unique expression of an idea could be protected, not the idea itself.

References

External links
 

Indian fantasy television series
DD National original programming
1997 Indian television series debuts
1998 Indian television series endings
Television shows based on comic strips
The Phantom television series
Indian action television series
Indian superhero television shows